Rudolf Lindau (10 October 1829 in Gardelegen, Saxony – 14 October 1910) was a German diplomat and author.

Milestones
Rudolf Lindau was responsible for commanding the first Swiss delegation to Japan on 28 April 1859, along with Swiss Aimé Humbert-Droz (who was appointed the envoy plenipotentiary for the Swiss federal government).

Works
His novels and tales were collected during 1893 (Berlin, 6 vols.). His works Reisegefährten and Der lange Holländer involve the lives of European residents in the Far East.

References

External links
 
 

1829 births
1910 deaths
People from Gardelegen
People from the Province of Saxony
German diplomats
German male writers
Writers from Saxony-Anhalt